The Central Philharmonic is a symphony orchestra (with chorus, chamber orchestra, and group of soloists) based in Beijing, China. Its predecessor was the Central Opera Company Orchestra. In 1996, it was renamed the China National Symphony Orchestra. 

The orchestra's first director was Zheng Xiaoying. Other directors have included Li Delun and Yan Liangkun. During the 1970s, Wang Jianzhong was its composer-in-residence. 

The orchestra has performed in China, Hong Kong, and Macau, as well as the United States, Spain, South Korea, and Taiwan. It has given the first performances of many new compositions by Chinese composers.

Notable works produced by the orchestra include the Yellow River Cantata and Yellow River Piano Concerto.

References

External links
 Article on Zheng Xiaoying

Musical groups established in 1956
China orchestras
Culture in Beijing
1956 establishments in China